This is a list of Belgian television related events from 1962.

Events
19 January - Fud Leclerc is selected to represent Belgium at the 1962 Eurovision Song Contest with his song "Ton nom". He is selected to be the seventh Belgian Eurovision entry during Eurosong.

Debuts

Television shows

Ending this year

Births
7 December - Piet Huysentruyt, TV chef

Deaths